Aphareus may refer to:

Aphareus, name of multiple personages in Greek mythology
Aphareus (writer) (4th century BCE), Ancient Greek orator and tragedian
Aphareus (fish), a genus of fishes in the family Lutjanidae